Analog Man may refer to:

 Analog Man (instrument maker), a guitar effects pedals manufacturer
 Analog Man (album), a 2012 album by Joe Walsh
 Analogman, a character in the video game Digimon World